Dolná Streda is a village and municipality in the Galanta District of the Trnava Region of western Slovakia.

History
In historical records the village was first mentioned in 1283.

Geography
It has a population of about 1410 people.

Genealogical resources

The records for genealogical research are available at the state archive "Statny Archiv in Bratislava, Slovakia"

 Roman Catholic church records (births/marriages/deaths): 1717-1895 (parish A)

See also
 List of municipalities and towns in Slovakia

External links
 Official page
https://web.archive.org/web/20080111223415/http://www.statistics.sk/mosmis/eng/run.html
Surnames of living people in Dolna Streda

Villages and municipalities in Galanta District